Jessica Brody is an American author and writing educator.  Her writing consists mainly of young adult fiction.

Early life
Brody graduated from Smith College in 2001 with a double major in Economics and French and worked for MGM Studios as a financial analyst until 2005, when she began to develop her career as a full-time author. She credits Bridget Jones's Diary with reigniting her childhood passion for writing: "I was so inspired and awed by the fact that a book could take me away from my life like that." Brody sold her first novel a year and a half after quitting MGM.

Books
While most of Brody's books are for teens, her first two published novels, The Fidelity Files and Love Under Cover, were women's fiction for adults. The first novel she wrote after leaving MGM was never published; after three years of submitting the completed manuscript to different agents, Brody started a new novel during the shopping period. She was signed by an agent for her second novel, five years after starting her career as an author. The agent sold that novel in ten days.

Brody published her first young adult novel, The Karma Club, in April 2010. She is known for her Unremembered and Disney Descendants: School of Secrets series of young adult fiction novels. The genesis of the Unremembered trilogy started with a news article about a teenage girl who was the sole survivor of a plane crash, which inspired Brody to speculate reasons why she was the only survivor.

Brody sold the publishing rights for her first middle-grade novel, Addie Montgomery's Shortcut to Growing Up, to Delacorte Press in 2015. The novel was eventually retitled Addie Bell's Shortcut to Growing Up when it was published in 2017.

Brody and fellow author Joanne Rendell developed the System Divine series, the first book of which, The Sky Without Stars, was published in March 2019. The publishing rights for the series were sold to Simon & Schuster in a six-figure deal in 2017.

Jennifer Hunter

The Unremembered trilogy

Short works in the Unremembered universe

"Unstolen" in

Disney Descendants: School of Secrets series

System Divine trilogy (with Joanne Rendell)

Standalone fiction

Nonfiction
"End of the World" in

Film adaptations
Film rights to Brody's book Unremembered have been acquired by Reliance Entertainment and Kintop Pictures. The Fidelity Files and 52 Reasons to Hate My Father have also been optioned for films. 52 Reasons is also being developed by Reliance and Kintop; and a screenplay has been written by Karen McCullah.

Writing Instruction

Brody offers writing instruction and advice on a variety of platforms, including YouTube and Udemy.  She founded Writing Mastery Academy, an online, subscription-based writing instruction platform offering video classes, webinars, and a community site.

References

American writers of young adult literature
American women novelists
Women writers of young adult literature
21st-century American novelists
21st-century American women writers
Living people
Smith College alumni
Year of birth missing (living people)